The 2007 Grand Prix Final may refer to:

2006–2007 Grand Prix of Figure Skating Final, which took place in December 2006, and is officially the "2007 Grand Prix Final"
2007–2008 Grand Prix of Figure Skating Final, which took place in December 2007, and is officially the "2008 Grand Prix Final"